Fingering may refer to:

 Fingering (music), the positioning of the fingers when playing a musical instrument
 Fingering (sexual act), the use of fingers to provide sexual stimulation
 Fingering, a slang term for the identification of the subject of a criminal accusation
 Salt fingering, a mixing process that occurs when salty water overlies relatively colder, fresher water
 Viscous fingering, the formation of patterns in a morphologically unstable interface

See also
Finger (disambiguation)
Finger-ring
Fingerling (disambiguation)